Claudia Koster (born 22 March 1992) is a Dutch road cyclist, who currently rides for UCI Women's Continental Team .

References

External links
 
 

1992 births
Dutch female cyclists
Living people
Sportspeople from Zaanstad
Cyclists from North Holland